Tanya Sharma (born 27 September 1995) is an Indian television actress. She is known for portraying the parallel lead characters in Saath Nibhaana Saathiya and Sasural Simar Ka 2.

Career

Early struggles (2011–14)
Sharma made her television debut in Afsar Bitiya (2011–2012), playing the role of Chanchal Raj. It was followed by the mythological drama Devon Ke Dev...Mahadev, where she was cast as Devasena, and Fear Files in an episodic appearance but these roles failed to get her wider acclaim.

Rise to success (2015–present)
Sharma went to have her breakthrough role as Meera Modi, the parallel new generation lead in Rashmi Sharma's most successful long-running StarPlus soap opera Saath Nibhaana Saathiya from 2015 to 2017, earning her massive universal fame.

In 2018, she starred in Zee TV show Woh Apna Sa as Binni Jindal. She featured in three different standalone episodes of &TV popular anthology drama Laal Ishq in different characters.

In February 2019, Sharma got her second big role when she was finalized to play Saanvi "Anjor" Rajvanshi in Colors TV's social drama Udaan.

Television

References

External links

 Tanya Sharma on IMDb
 

Living people
1995 births
Indian television actresses
Indian soap opera actresses
Actresses in Hindi television
21st-century Indian actresses